Conasprella vantwoudti is a species of sea snail, a marine gastropod mollusc in the family Conidae, the cone snails, cone shells or cones.

Distribution
This marine species occurs in the Caribbean Sea off Aruba

References

 Petuch E., Berschauer D. & Poremski A. (2015). Additions to the cone shell faunas of Australia and Aruba (Conidae, Conilithidae). The Festivus. 47(4): 219-228

vantwoudti
Gastropods described in 2015